The Space Between Us may refer to:

The Space Between Us (film), a 2017 American science fiction film about a teen who is born on Mars and travels to Earth
The Space Between Us (novel), a 2006 Indian English-language novel set in Mumbai, written by Thrity Umrigar
The Space Between Us, a 2014 English-language novel of Zoya Pirzad's book (originally titled Yek ruz mande be eid pak) in 1998 about an Armenian-Iranian community set on the Caspian Sea and Tehran. 
The Space Between Us (Craig Armstrong album), a 1998 electronic music album
The Space Between Us, a 2011 composition by David A. Jaffe

See also 
The Space Between (disambiguation)
Between Us (disambiguation)
"Space Between Us", a song from the Steps album Tears on the Dancefloor